The Happiness of Three Women is a 1954 British drama film directed by Maurice Elvey and starring Brenda de Banzie, Donald Houston and Petula Clark. The film was released on the Odeon Circuit as a double bill with The Crowded Day. It was made at Walton Studios with sets designed by the art director John Stoll. It was adapted from Eynon Evans's Welsh-set play Wishing Well.

Cast
 Brenda de Banzie as Jane Price  
 Eynon Evans as Amos Parry  
 Petula Clark as Delith 
 Donald Houston as John  
 Patricia Burke as Ann Murray 
 Patricia Cutts as Irene Jennings  
 Bill O'Connor as Peter Jennings  
 Gladys Hay as Amelia Smith  
 Glyn Houston as Morgan  
 Emrys Leyshon as David Miles  
 Hugh Pryse as The Minister  
 Jessie Evans as Blodwen  
 John Lewis as Bus Driver  
 Mary Jones as Mary Lewis  
 Julie Milton as Nancy  
 Eira Griffiths as Hannah 
 Ronnie Harries

References

Bibliography
 Chibnall, Steve & McFarlane, Brian. The British 'B' Film. Palgrave MacMillan, 2009.

External links

1954 films
British drama films
1954 drama films
1950s English-language films
Films directed by Maurice Elvey
Films shot at Nettlefold Studios
Films set in Wales
British films based on plays
British black-and-white films
1950s British films